Two steamships of the Clan Line were named Clan Colquhoun:

Ship names